Jessica Green  (born February 11, 1993) is an Australian actress. She is known for her regular appearances as Kiki on the teen drama Lightning Point, as Cleopatra in the Netflix series Roman Empire and as Talon in The CW series The Outpost.

Life and career 
Jessica Green was born on the island of Tasmania, Australia. At the age of 19 her martial arts skills landed her the role of Kiki for 26 episodes of the fantasy teen drama series Lightning Point. Having minimal prior training in acting, Green worked for six months with an acting coach during filming of the series. In 2014, Green appeared as Amber in the Australian crime drama film Rise, and as Rebecca in the 2016 supernatural horror film Red Billabong. In 2018, Green landed a main role as Cleopatra in series 2 of Roman Empire - Julius Caesar: Master of Rome.

Between 2018 and 2020, Green played the character of Talon, the last survivor of her race, the Blackbloods, in 36 episodes of The CW's  fantasy-adventure drama television series The Outpost. Green reportedly performed her own stunts and fight scenes during filming, with only minor injuries. Green employs a strict fitness regime with well-disciplined daily training and maintains a healthy diet and lifestyle.

She attended the 45th Saturn Awards at the Avalon Hollywood, Los Angeles in 2019, to represent The Outpost, which was nominated for Best Fantasy Television Series 2019, losing out to Game of Thrones.

Green resumed filming of the third season of The Outpost in Serbia in late 2020, alongside fellow actors Jake Stormoen and Anand Desai-Barochia.  The CW announced that series 3 of The Outpost will be extended by a further 13 episodes in 2020.

In 2022, Green joined the cast of upcoming film Air Jordan a project involving Ben Affleck, Matt Damon, Jason Bateman and Gustaf Skarsgård.

Filmography

Film

Television

References

External links 
 
Jessica Green - Instagram
Interview with KTLA5 News

Living people
1993 births
21st-century Australian actresses
Australian television actresses
Australian film actresses
Actresses from Tasmania